Krameria is the only genus in the Krameriaceae family, of which any of the approximately 18 species are commonly known as rhatany, ratany or rattany. Rhatany is also the name given to krameria root, a botanical remedy consisting of the dried root of para rhatany (Krameria argentea) or Peruvian rhatany (Krameria lappacea).

The biological action of rhatany is caused by the astringent rhataniatannic acid, which is similar to tannic acid. Infusions have been used as a gargle, a lozenge, especially when mixed with cocaine, as a local hemostatic and remedy for diarrhea. When finely powdered, the dried roots furnished a frequent constituent of tooth powders. The powdered roots have also served, especially in Portugal, to color wines ruby red. The root bark contains an almost insoluble free red substance called ratanhia red.

Krameria are found across the Americas, with most native to the tropical regions. They are perennial shrubs which act as root parasites on other plants. The flowers have glands called elaiophores which produce a lipid which is collected by bees of the genus Centris as they pollinate the flowers.

Selected species
Krameria argentea Mart. ex Spreng. – para rhatany
Krameria bicolor S.Watson (=K. grayi) – white rhatany
Krameria cistoidea
Krameria erecta Willd. ex Schult. & Schult. f. – Pima rhatany, purple heather, littleleaf rhatany
Krameria ixine L. – abrojo Colorado
Krameria lanceolata Torr. – trailing krameria
Krameria lappacea (Dombey) Burdet & B.B.Simpson (=K. triandra, K. iluca) – Peruvian rhatany
Krameria ramosissima (A.Gray) S.Watson – manystem rhatany

References

Simpson, B. B. (1982). Krameria (Krameriaceae) flowers: Orientation and elaiophore morphology. Taxon 31:3 517–528

External links

Jepson Manual Treatment
USDA Plants Profile
Parasitic Plant Connection: Krameriaceae

 
Rosid genera